Labriola is a surname of Italian origin. Notable people with the surname include:

Antonio Labriola (1843–1904), Italian Marxist theoretician
Teresa Labriola (1873–1941), Italian writer, jurist, and feminist
Arturo Labriola (1873–1959), Italian syndicalist, politician, and journalist
Jerry Labriola (born 1931), American mystery writer, physician, and politician
Jochen Labriola (1942-1988), German-American painter
mick laBriola (born 1951), American musician, educator, stained glass artist, and songwriter
Peter Labriola (born 1956), American author and cartoonist
David Labriola (born 1960), American politician in the Connecticut House of Representatives
Steven L. Labriola (born 1962), American politician
Mark Labriola II, lead singer of the Christian rock band Foolish Things

Italian-language surnames
Surnames of Italian origin
English-language surnames